The Ministry of Finance and Economy (MoFE) is a cabinet-level ministry in the government of Brunei which is responsible for the monetary, fiscal and economic policies and development in the country. It was established immediately upon Brunei's independence on 1 January 1984. It is currently led by a minister in which the incumbent is Hassanal Bolkiah, the Sultan of Brunei, as well as a second minister and two deputy ministers.

Budget 
In the fiscal year 2022–23, the ministry has been allocated a budget of B$1 billion, an eight percent increase from the previous year.

Ministers

First Minister

Second Minister

See also
 Brunei Darussalam Central Bank

Notes

References

External links
 

Finance
Brunei
Brunei
Ministries established in 1984
1984 establishments in Brunei
Economy of Brunei